Hopewell High School is located in the northern part of Mecklenburg County, serving the western portion of Huntersville and also, serving some of the Northwest Charlotte area. The school was founded in 2001. The school's main rival is William A. Hough High School. Hopewell's athletic teams are nicknamed the Titans.

Hopewell Hooligans 
The Hopewell Hooligans were created in the year of 2006–2007 and was headed by the class of 2007. Students dressed up in bizarre outfits, such as long socks, armbands, spray painted shirts, and painted hair. The school had to adjust new policies after opposing schools complained that the Hooligans were being too "spirited" and personally isolating players.

Academics
Hopewell High School offers over 14 Advanced Placement courses, as well as honors and regular courses in a broad range of academic disciplines.  Hopewell is also home to an Academy of Engineering, and an Academy of Hospitality and Tourism, both of which are four year programs run by Hopewell through partnerships with organizations in the applicable field.

Media appearances 
Hopewell High School has been featured on TruTV's The Principal's Office.

Notable alumni 
 De'Mon Brooks, professional basketball player
 Brandyn Curry, professional basketball player
 Cameron Moore, singer/songwriter and Christian pop artist
 Luther Nicholson, rapper, better known by his stage name Lute

References 

Educational institutions established in 2001
Public high schools in North Carolina
Schools in Mecklenburg County, North Carolina
2001 establishments in North Carolina